Eagley is a village of the unparished area of South Turton, in the Metropolitan Borough of Bolton, Greater Manchester, England. Historically part of Lancashire, it lies on southern slopes of the West Pennine Moors.

Eagley Brook passes through the village and runs by Eagley Mills which are now converted flats which overlook the river.

Association football club Eagley F.C., notable for being the first ever opponents of Preston North End F.C., are based in the village.

Eagley Cricket Club currently plays in the Bolton Cricket League.

See also

Listed buildings in South Turton

References

External links

 Photos and information about Eagley

Villages in Greater Manchester
West Pennine Moors
Geography of the Metropolitan Borough of Bolton